Forest Edward "Frosty" Able (born July 27, 1932) is an American former basketball player.

A 6'3" (1.90 m) guard, Able attended Fairdale High School in Louisville, Kentucky. He enrolled at the University of Louisville and played a season on their freshman team during the 1951–52 season. Able was the subject of controversy when he announced his intention to enrol at Western Kentucky State College (now Western Kentucky University) to be closer to his girlfriend who also attended the college. Able starred with the Western Kentucky Hilltoppers, where he tallied 1,221 career points. As a senior, Able was named the Hilltoppers’ most valuable player and named to the Newspaper Enterprise Association 26-man All-America squad. 

After his college career, he had a brief stint with the Syracuse Nationals, who selected him in the 1956 NBA draft. Forest is a member of the Western Kentucky University Hall of Fame. Able’s career lasted one game, recording two field goal attempts, an assist and a rebound against the Rochester Royals. He was released shortly after his debut.

Following the close of his playing career, Able became head coach at his alma mater Fairdale High in 1959.

NBA career statistics

Regular season

|-
| style="text-align:left;"| 
| style="text-align:left;"| Syracuse
| 1 || – || 1.0 || .000 || – || .000 || 1.0 || 1.0 || – || – || 0.0
|- class="sortbottom"
| style="text-align:left;"| Career
| style="text-align:left;"|
| 1 || – || 1.0 || .000 || – || .000 || 1.0 || 1.0 || – || – || 0.0

References

External links
NBA stats @ basketballreference.com
WKU HOF List
Draft Review- College Stats

1932 births
Living people
American men's basketball coaches
American men's basketball players
Basketball coaches from Kentucky
Basketball players from Louisville, Kentucky
Fairdale High School alumni
High school basketball coaches in Kentucky
Point guards
Shooting guards
Syracuse Nationals draft picks
Syracuse Nationals players
Western Kentucky Hilltoppers basketball players